"Better Than Yourself (Criminal Mind Pt 2)" is a single by Danish band Lukas Graham. The song was released in Denmark as a digital download in 22 October 2012. The song peaked at number one on the Danish Singles Chart. The song was written by Lukas Forchhammer, Rasmus Hedegaard and Brandon Beal. The song's opening piano accompaniment is a direct quote from Beethoven's Moonlight Sonata.

Track listing

Chart performance

Weekly charts

Release history

References

2012 songs
2012 singles
Lukas Graham songs
Number-one singles in Denmark
Songs written by Lukas Forchhammer
Songs written by Brandon Beal
Songs written by Hedegaard (DJ)
Copenhagen Records singles
Popular songs based on classical music